Caidian District is one of 13 urban districts that constitute the   prefecture-level city of Wuhan, the capital of Hubei Province, China, forming part of the city's southwestern suburbs and situated on the northwestern (left) bank of the Yangtze River. On the left bank it borders the districts of Dongxihu to the north, Hanyang to the northeast, and Hannan to the south; on the opposite bank, Jiangxia and Hongshan. It also borders Xiaogan to the northwest and Xiantao to the southwest.

Introduction

The District of Caidian is situated along a tributary of the Yangtze river. There are karaoke bars, open markets and swathes of local shops from start-ups to well known chains. There is a main supermarket in the high street and a few Western-style bakeries. The town is fast developing due to globalization. There are numerous hospitals and schools in the town. A local specialty is hot, spicy beef noodles, which is boiled in large cauldrons. Some residents achieve notable academic success, attending local universities within Wuhan, such as Wuhan university, a top ten university in China.

Lotus grows in the small lakes within the towns and are managed by government workers. Chinese New Year is a popular time for the town with many fireworks being sold and lit. Bus services to Wuhan city are excellent and affordable.

Geography

The eastern half of the district is dominated by urban land. There are scattered patches of forest throughout the district. The southern tip of the district has a large rural settlement. There is a thin forest corridor that stretches from the northern part of the district to the southern tip. This is broken up by water, and in the center, urban land. The district is broken up by bodies of waters and rivers. Most of the land is arable land for farming.

Administrative Divisions

Caidian District implemented many changes in administrative division organization after the 2010 Census. Among the changes, Suohe Town has become Suohe Subdistrict. Caidian District currently administers eight subdistricts, two administrative committees, one township and one farm:

History

Some local residents remember when the Japanese marched through Caidian town. Anti-Japanese television shows are played on television to this day.

Suohe Town

This town contains a weaving mill.

Lakes

The following lakes are present in the district:

 Houguan lake

Recently a walkway was built across the lake to improve accessibility. Housing developers are banned from building within 50 meters of this structure.

 Xiaozha lake
 Guanlian lake
 Chenhu lake
 Wanjia lake
 Zhushan lake

Shimao Carnival Business Center Theme Park

This will be the largest indoor theme park in China, and is set to be complete by 2015. It has cost $0.7 billion and stretches over 8 million square meters. It will be located by Houguan Lake. It will have the following themes:

Ice Age, Heaven Town, Warriors Forest, Rainbow Continent, and DreamWorks

Crimes Against Humanity

In 2000 it was reported in Caidian that local officials drowned a baby. The baby was held and submerged in the water of a paddy field. The baby was then thrown in a toilet.

Bee Mystery

On 5 June 2014 it was discovered that 2.4 million bees had died in the district. The cause of this was a mystery, though it was suspected that the cause was pesticides.

Dead Fish

100,000 kilos of fish perished at a fish farm in Caidian in 2007. The cause of this was said to be blue-green algae.

Tree planting

Charities coordinate with local schools to plant trees in the district.

Popular Culture

Part of the book 'A Corpse's Transmutation' is set in Caidian, where an old man and his son own an inn.

Climate

Transport 
Line 4 of Wuhan Metro is serving Caidian District.

Infrastructure 
Caidian District has been chosen by the Wuhan City authorities to construct a temporary 1000 bed hospital named Huoshenshan Hospital to cope with the Wuhan coronavirus in January 2020. Four state owned civil engineering firms are developing the site.

Gallery

References 

Geography of Wuhan
County-level divisions of Hubei